Delaine (de laine, Muslin de Laine, Mousseline de Laine) was a kind of mixed cloth with cotton warp and wool in the weft. Delaines have many variations such as made of undyed yarns, and also printed or piece dyed. Delaine was a type of cloth used to manufacture women's dresses that was traded in the nineteenth century under many names to suit importers and traders. Moreover, it appeared that the plaintiffs' goods differed from delaines in various other respects.

Etymology 
Delaine (de laine), Muslin de Laine, and Mousseline de Laine are all French words for wool cloth. This fabric [de laine] is also called "chaine cotton" in French, which means "cotton warp," and sometimes mi-laine, which translates "half wool."

Fabric structure 
Delaines were woven using cotton warp and worsted filling. It was a kind of plain thin fabric.

Delaine wool 
Delaine wool grades were specified for Delain cloth; they were strong and fine with a 3-inch length.

Dyeing of Delaine 
Due to the origins of cotton and wool fibers, cotton and wool have different dye affinities; solid colors in Delaines were difficult to achieve. When delaine colors were mixed in an inept manner, the cotton and wool colors were drastically different, resulting in the "threadiness" impression.

Variations 
Delaines were also produced using a silk warp and a wool weft, as well as entirely of wool.

Use 
Delaines were used in blouses and various ladies' dresses. They were printed for summer clothing material between 1830 and 1840.

See also 

 Delaine Merino
 Muslin

References 

Woven fabrics